Kathy Jean Barnette (born September 6, 1971) is an American politician and political commentator. A member of the Republican Party, she ran for the United States House of Representatives in Pennsylvania’s 4th congressional district in 2020, and unsuccessfully sought the party's nomination in the 2022 United States Senate election in Pennsylvania. She has espoused homophobic and Islamophobic views, and has promoted conspiracy theories.

Early life 
Barnette's mother was raped at the age of 11 by a 21-year-old man. Her mother became pregnant as a result of the rape, which led to Barnette's birth on September 6, 1971, in Alabama. She was raised by her mother on a pig farm in the south of the state, in a house where her great-great-great grandmother, who was born a slave, formerly lived.

She received an undergraduate degree in finance from Troy State University, and an M.B.A. from Fontbonne University. Barnette served seven years in the United States Army Reserve and United States National Guard.

Professional career 
Barnette worked as a corporate financial analyst for many years. Barnette's entry into political commentary began with political videos on Facebook. The videos led her to becoming an irregular guest on Fox & Friends. She also became a regular commentator on Philadelphia conservative radio. Barnette has made frequent appearances on One America News Network and Newsmax as well.

Political career 
Barnette entered politics by running for Pennsylvania's 4th congressional district in the 2020 election. She was unopposed in the Republican primary. She lost the general election to incumbent Madeleine Dean and refused to concede, while later saying she had accepted the results of the election, Barnette continued to raise doubts about her own election and the wider 2020 presidential election.

On Election Day, Barnette filed a lawsuit against Montgomery County election officials claiming that the county violated state laws on pre-canvassing ballots prior to the opening of polls by notifying voters of potential problems with their mail-in ballots. Her attorneys then withdrew the lawsuit.

Barnette had a close relationship with My Pillow CEO Mike Lindell for a time. Lindell said of Barnette in June 2021, "She is just an amazing person" and "I never heard of anyone being so tenacious."

Barnette announced she would run to fill retiring Senator Pat Toomey's seat in early April 2021, and received some high-profile endorsements from Michael Flynn and Sebastian Gorka. She raised about $600,000 by June 30, 2021, more than Sean Parnell or Jeff Bartos, the major candidates at the time. She surged in the polls in late March 2022 and started receiving major attention from news outlets in May.

Barnette began to receive scrutiny over past tweets she had made, including some spreading the conspiracy theory that former President Barack Obama is a Muslim, and others that have been described as homophobic and Islamophobic. In a 2015 YouTube video, Barnette said that it is okay to discriminate against Muslims and compared rejecting Islam to "rejecting Hitler's or Stalin's worldviews." In comments on her radio show, she said that accepting homosexuality would lead to accepting pedophilia and incest. In one post, she called a transgender person "deformed" and "demonic."

On May 15, 2022, images surfaced showing that Barnette had participated in the "Stop the Steal" rally that preceded the 2021 United States Capitol insurrection; though her campaign has denied participating in any acts of violence, she has stated that she "brought" three buses of "pissed off patriots" to the rally.

Barnette came third in the 2022 primary, behind Mehmet Oz and David McCormick, a loss she blamed on comments made by Fox News host Sean Hannity. In October 2022, she stated that she would vote for Oz in the election, but declined to endorse him.

Political positions 
According to The Tennessee Star, in 2022 Barnette ran "on a platform emphasizing free-market health care, border security, school choice, domestic energy production, tax reform, and protection of the unborn."

Barnette is opposed to abortion, including in cases of rape and incest, citing her own life as "the product of a rape" as inspiration.

Electoral history

Personal life 
Barnette is married to her husband Carl, and has two children. She stated that she has been a Christian since she was about 19 years old.

Published works 
 (2020). Nothing to Lose, Everything to Gain: Being Black and Conservative in America. Center Street.

References

External links

Kathy Barnette at Politifact

1971 births
Living people
Candidates in the 2022 United States Senate elections
People from Alabama
21st-century American women politicians
21st-century American politicians
African-American women in politics
Pennsylvania Republicans
Women in Pennsylvania politics
People from Montgomery County, Pennsylvania
Black conservatism in the United States
Troy University alumni
Fontbonne University alumni